Abranches is a surname. Notable people with the surname include:

Adelina Abranches (1866–1945), Portuguese actor
Aluizio Abranches, Brazilian film director
Collin Abranches (born 1991), Indian footballer
Henrique Abranches (1932–2004), Angolan poet
Joaquim Abranches (born 1985), Indian footballer